Francesco Brioschi (22 December 1824 – 13 December 1897) was an Italian mathematician.

Biography
Brioschi was born in Milan in 1824. He graduated from the Collegio Borromeo in 1847. 

From 1850 he taught analytical mechanics in the University of Pavia. After the Italian unification in 1861, he was elected to the Chamber of Deputies and then appointed twice secretary of the Italian Education Ministry. In 1863 he founded the Polytechnic University of Milan, where he worked until his death, lecturing in hydraulics, analytical mechanics and construction engineering. In 1865 he entered in the Senate of the Kingdom. In 1870 he became a member of the Accademia dei lincei and in 1884 he succeeded Quintino Sella as president of the National Academy of the Lincei. He directed the Il Politecnico (The Polytechnic) review and, between 1867 and 1877, the Annali di Matematica Pura ed Applicata (Annals of pure and applied mathematics). He died in Milan in 1897.

As mathematician, Brioschi published in Italy various algebraic theories and studied the problem of solving fifth and sixth degree equations using elliptic functions. Brioschi is also remembered as a distinguished teacher: among his students in the University of Pavia there were Eugenio Beltrami, Luigi Cremona and Felice Casorati.

Works
 
 Théorie des déterminants et leurs principales applications (Mallet-Bachelier, Paris, 1856) (French translation of "La teorica dei determinanti e le sue principali applicazioni" by E. Combescure)
 
 
 Opere matematiche di Francesco Brioschi. Pubblicate per cura del comitato per le onoranze a Francesco Brioschi (G. Ascoli, E. Beltrami, G. Colombo, L. Cremona, G. Negri, G. Schiaparelli), vol. 1 (U. Hoepli, Milano, 1901–1909)
 Opere matematiche di Francesco Brioschi pubblicate per cura del Comitato per le onoranze a Francesco Brioschi... (vols. 1-5) (U. Hoepli, Milano, 1901–1909)

See also
Brioschi formula
Politecnico di Milano

Notes

References
Grande Dizionario Enciclopedico (UTET, 1967)
Enciclopedia Universal (Rizzoli-Larousse, 1967)

External links
 Mac Tutor biography
 
 Tricomi: La Matematica Italiana 1800-1950 (entry on Brioschi)

1824 births
1897 deaths
Scientists from Milan
19th-century Italian mathematicians
Academic staff of the University of Pavia
Members of the Royal Swedish Academy of Sciences
Academic staff of the Polytechnic University of Milan